Staff Sergeant Denise Michelle Rose (22 April 1970 – 31 October 2004) of the Royal Military Police's Special Investigation Branch was the first British female soldier to die in military operations in the Iraq War. Her death was later ruled to have been a suicide.

Rose was found dead from a gunshot wound at the Army base in the Shatt-al-Arab Hotel, Basra, on 31 October 2004.

Rose was originally from Liverpool, England. She joined the Royal Military Police in 1989, and trained as an SIB investigator in 1995, conducting investigations into serious incidents within the military in the UK and Cyprus. She deployed as a volunteer to Iraq on 27 September 2004, operating as part of a small team of specialist investigators to provide security for the people of Iraq and assist in the rebuilding of the country through the provision of a well trained police force.

References

1970 births
2004 deaths
British military personnel killed in action in the Iraq War
Royal Military Police soldiers
Suicides by firearm in Iraq
British military personnel who committed suicide
British Army personnel of the Iraq War
Women in the British Army
Women in the Iraq War
Military personnel from Liverpool